SinoMaps Press, previously known as China Cartographic Publishing House, is a publisher in Beijing, China, specializing in professional map publishing.

Established in December 1954, it is the only national-level map publisher in China today. In half a century, SinoMaps Press has published over 13,600 titles of various maps and atlases, textbooks, academic books and journals in a total of 3.65 billion copies, accounting for 90% of China's total map publications.

References

 Chinaculture.org - China Cartographic Publishing House
 SinoMaps Press - English

External links 
  Official website

Book publishing companies of China
Map publishing companies
Mass media in Beijing